Shahu Modak (25 April 1918 – 11 May 1993) was an Indian actor who acted in many Hindi as well as Marathi movies. Shahu Modak was mostly famous for the mythological characters that he played. He mostly played the roles of Krishna, and Jñāneśvar.

Personal life
Shahu Modak was born in a Marathi Christian family of Ahmednagar on 25 April 1918.

Shahu Modak died on 11 May 1993.

Filmography
Shahu Modak acted in numerous films from 1932 to 1986. He played lord Krishna's character in around 30 movies. He also sang two songs for movie Bharat Milap.

Manoos Award
The Rangat Sangat Pratishthan gives this award since 2001 to a senior artist who has been associated with Shahu Modak as an actor.
This award is given at the hands of police commissioner since Shahu Modak played the role of a police in film Manoos. Baby Shakuntala, Asha Kale and Sulochana has been some of the recipients of this award.

References

External links

Male actors in Marathi cinema
Male actors in Hindi cinema
Male actors from Maharashtra
1993 deaths
1918 births
20th-century Indian male actors